Aulacofusus brevicauda is a species of sea snail, a marine gastropod mollusc in the family Buccinidae, the true whelks.

Subspecies Aulacofusus brevicauda fortilirata (Sowerby I, 1913)

Description

Distribution

References

 Deshayes, G. P., 1832 Histoire naturelle des vers. In: Encyclopédie méthodique, vol. II(2), p. 1-594
 Kosyan A.R. & Kantor Yu.I. (2013). Revision of the genus Aulacofusus Dall, 1918 (Gastropoda: Buccinidae). Ruthenica<. 23(1): 1-33

External links
 Deshayes G.P. (1830-1832). Encyclopédie méthodique ou par ordre de matières. Histoire naturelle des Vers et Mollusques. Vol. 2, part 1: i-vi, 1-256 [Livraison 101, 1 Feb 1830; part 2: 1-144 [Livraison 101, 1 Feb. 1830], 145-594 [Livraison 102, 29 Sept. 1832]. Vol. 3: 595-1152 [Livraison 102, 29 Sept. 1832 ]
 Mörch O.A.L. 1862. Description d'une nouvelle espèce de fuseau. Journal de Conchyliologie, 10: 36-37, pl. 1 fig. 1
 Middendorff T. A. von. (1849). Beiträge zur einer Malacozoologica Rossica, II. Aufzählung und Beschreibung der zur Meeresfauna Russlands gehörigen Einschaler. Mémoires de l'Académie Impériale des Sciences de St-Petersbourg, sixième série, Sciences naturelles. 6: 329-516, pl. 1-11
 Bouchet, P.; Warén, A. (1985). Revision of the Northeast Atlantic bathyal and abyssal Neogastropoda excluding Turridae (Mollusca, Gastropoda). Bollettino Malacologico. supplement 1: 121-296

Buccinidae
Gastropods described in 1832